The Aftermath is a 2019 drama film directed by James Kent and written by Joe Shrapnel and Anna Waterhouse, based on the 2013 novel of the same name by Rhidian Brook. It stars Keira Knightley, Alexander Skarsgård and Jason Clarke. The film had its world premiere at the Glasgow Film Festival on 26 February 2019. It was released in the United States on 15 March 2019, by Fox Searchlight Pictures. It is the last Fox Searchlight Pictures film to be released before the acquisition of 21st Century Fox by Disney.

Plot
The Aftermath is set in British occupation zone in post-war Germany in 1945. Rachael Morgan arrives in the ruins of Hamburg in the bitter German winter to be reunited with her husband Lewis Morgan, a colonel of British Forces Germany charged with rebuilding the shattered city and dealing with violent insurgent Werwolf activities. The couple, whose relationship is tense due to their son Michael being killed during the Blitz by Luftwaffe bombing, will be staying in the requisitioned house of German architect Stefan Lubert and his teenage daughter Freda Lubert. Lewis decides to let Stefan and Freda stay in the house in the attic, a decision that Rachael is initially unhappy with because of her hatred of Germans over Michael's death. She is very rude to Stefan. Meanwhile, Freda connects with Bertie, a young German deeply involved in the Werwolf movement.

However, Rachael bonds with Stefan over shared grief: Stefan's wife was killed by Allied bombing. Rachael and Stefan begin having an affair. The situation is complicated by British Forces Germany suspecting Stefan of Werwolf involvement, though it is actually Freda's boyfriend Bertie who is involved. Lewis eventually realises Rachael and Stefan are having an affair when he hears of her advocating on Stefan's behalf. When Lewis confronts Rachael, she tells him that she is leaving him to be with Stefan. Bertie tries to assassinate Lewis but instead kills Lewis' chauffeur by mistake. Bertie attempts to escape through the woods but falls through ice to his death. Lewis tells Rachael to leave the next morning. After Lewis admits his grief over Michael to Rachael, she hugs him. She accompanies Stefan and Freda to the railway station but decides to stay with Lewis instead of leaving with Stefan.

Cast

Production
In August 2016, it was announced Fox Searchlight Pictures acquired the film, with Alexander Skarsgård and Keira Knightley, James Kent directing it from a screenplay by Joe Shrapnel and Anna Waterhouse, while Ridley Scott as a producer under his Scott Free Productions banner. That same month, Jason Clarke joined the cast of the film. In February 2017, Fionn O'Shea joined the cast.

Principal photography began in January 2017, in Prague, Czech Republic.

Home media
The Aftermath was released on DVD and Blu-ray on 11 June 2019.

Reception

Box office
The Aftermath has grossed $9.2 million worldwide.

Critical response
The website's critics consensus reads, "Tasteful to a fault, The Aftermath is worth seeking out only for the most passionate period drama enthusiasts." On Metacritic, the film has a weighted average score of 43 out of 100 based on 33 critics, indicating "mixed or average reviews".

References

External links
 
 
 

Scott Free Productions films
German drama films
British drama films
American drama films
Films set in 1945
Films set in Hamburg
Films shot in the Czech Republic
English-language German films
Films shot in Prague
BBC Film films
Fox Searchlight Pictures films
Films directed by James Kent (director)
2010s English-language films
2010s American films
2010s British films
2010s German films